John McEwen was the 18th Prime Minister of Australia.

John McEwen may also refer to:

 John McEwen (athlete) (born 1974), American hammer thrower
 John Blackwood McEwen (1868–1948), Scottish classical composer
 John L. McEwen (1928–2010), American politician
 Sir John McEwen, 1st Baronet (1894–1962), Scottish politician
 John McEwen (cricketer) (1862–1902), English cricketer